Dibekli can refer to:

 Dibekli, Ağın
 Dibekli, Ayvacık
 Dibekli, Gümüşhane
 Dibekli, Hınıs